Tyrone Bentley Knight (born 22 January 1954) is a former Barbadian cricketer who represented the Barbadian national team in West Indian domestic cricket.

Knight was born in Saint Michael Parish, Barbados. In 1974, he was selected to tour England with the West Indies under-19s, playing three Test matches against the England under-19s. Knight opened the bowling with future West Indies international Wayne Daniel in the first match, and took 4/52 and 4/42, dismissing future England internationals Chris Tavaré and Mike Gatting in both innings. In the second Test, he took 3/61 and 8/86, finishing with match figures of 11/147. Both his second-innings figures and his match figures set new records for under-19 Test cricket. Knight finished with 25 wickets from his three under-19 Tests. Despite his performance at that level, his career in senior West Indian domestic cricket was limited to just two matches, both of which came in the 1977–78 Geddes Grant/Harrison Line Trophy. He appeared in both of Barbados' matches at the tournament, against Jamaica and the Windward Islands.

References

External links
Player profile and statistics at CricketArchive
Player profile and statistics at ESPNcricinfo

1954 births
Living people
Barbadian cricketers
Barbados cricketers
People from Saint Michael, Barbados